Mrinalini is a Bengali novel written by Bankim Chandra Chatterjee. The novel was first published in 1869. This was Chatterjee's third novel, and he was 30 years old when the novel was first published.

Plot 
The story revolves around the prince of Magadha, Hemchandra and his lover Mrinalini, a middle-class girl from Mathura. When they both falls in love, Hemchandra becomes weak and forgets about his duties for his country. Yavana captured his kingdom but instead of fighting with Yavanas he was marrying secretly with Mrinalini. 

To make Hemchandra realize about his duties, Madhvacharya, Hemchandra's teacher secretly sends Mrinalini to Rishikesh's house in the Gond Kingdom. What will happen when Hemchandra gets to know about Madhvacharya's conspiracy? Will he succeed in his mission? Is Madhvacharya a betrayer? What will happen when society gets know about Hemchandra and Mrinalini's marriage? Will society accept it?

Characters 
Mrinalini a middle- class beautiful girl from Mathura who was in love with the prince of Magadha, Hemchandra. She was sent away to Lakshmanavati to a rich Brahmin Rishikesh by Madhvacharya, the family priest of Hemchandra because Hemchandra forgotten his duties while in love with her. She, there at Rishikesh's house became a good friend of his daughter, Manimalini and she told her about her secret marriage with Hemchandra. Hemchandra sent Girijaayaa, his female servant to Mrinalini at Lakshmanavati to send a message to her that they can't unite until Hemchandra suppress Bakhtiar Khilji from Magadha. She, then become a good friend of Girijaayaa and was tried to molest by Byomkesh, womanizer son of Rishikesh. She was thrown out of the house by Rishikesh after this misunderstanding and false accusation of Byomkesh that Mrinalini has some illegal relationships with other men. Mrinalini then moved to Gaud, where Hemchandra with the help of Madhvacharya was helping the king to throw out Yavanas from India. After many attempts, Hemchandra United with Mrinalini after passing out so many conspiracies and hurdles. 
Hemchandra the prince of Magadha and husband of Mrinalini 
Pashupati Minister of Gaud who actually supports Bakhtiar Khilji. 
Bakhtiar Khilji was the king of Yonas. 
Girijaayaa friend of Mrinalini 
Digvijay husband of Girijaayaa 
Manimalini friend of Mrinalini 
Lakshmansen King of Gaud 
Shaantsheel messanger of Pashupati

References

External links 
 Mrinalini at NLTR 

Novels by Bankim Chandra Chattopadhyay
1869 novels